Times Music, a division of The Times Group, is an Indian record label and music publisher. Headquartered in Mumbai, Times Music started operations in 1998 and has a catalogue of more than 60,000 tracks in all languages and genres. Times Music is also the Indian sub-publisher for global music publishing firms Warner/Chappell Music, Peermusic, Wixen Music, CTM Publishing and Cloud 9 Music Publishing. Times Music was one of the early pioneers of remixes in India and was an early leader in the devotional and spiritual music genre. The label has also published regional, folk, Bollywood and traditional albums in languages such as Telugu, Punjabi, Bengali, Gujarati, Assamese and  Kannada and has a strong regional presence.

History 
Times Music was established in 1991 under the leadership of Arun Arora, who was then the President and Executive Director of The Times of India and Times Global Broadcasting Co. Ltd. In 2000, the Indian music industry was ruled by Bollywood and International Music. The intent of the label was to create albums tailored to appeal to the discerning audience, which resulted in Times Music the concepts of spiritual, world and remix music in India.

In 2009 Times Music become the first music company in India to introduce Brainwave Sound Technology album called Bhakti Band. This was a fusion devotional/spiritual album. The album was composed by Vaibhav Saxena.

Junglee Music 

In 2007, Times Music launched its independent Hindi and regional film music label, Junglee Music, to capitalise on the popularity of commercial film music. Junglee Music started with Welcome and followed it up with titles like Singh Is Kinng, Horn 'Ok' Pleassss, Dasvidaniya, Pink, Dhanak, Begum Jaan and Romeo Akbar Walter as well as southern film titles. Later Junglee Music also published music for Raja Natwarlal and Haider. The label also made its mark in regional films especially in Telugu, Tamil, Kannada, Bengali, Assamese, Punjabi, Gujarati, Rajasthani and Urdu.

Hindi films

Telugu films

Tamil films

Kannada films

Bengali films

Assamese films

Punjabi music

Pakistani films

Electronic dance music 
Times Music started importing and licensing electronic dance music releases in India in 2006. The label signed license deals with EDM labels such as Black Hole Recordings, Anjunabeats, Hommegga & Toco Asia. Times Music also released albums by artists such as Tiësto, Paul van Dyk, ATB, Above & Beyond and Skazi.

Independent music 
Times Music has been associated with independent (indie) music since the late 1990s and early 2000s. It was one of the first publishers of indie music in India, even before the term was coined by the music industry. Times Music has worked with iconic bands such as Indian Ocean, MIDIval Punditz, Mrigya, Viva and Band of Boys. Other prominent artists are Karsh Kale, Susheela Raman, Angaraag Mahanta and Kumar Bhabesh.

Times Living 

Times Living was earlier known as Times Wellness, a division of Times Music, which was established in 2006. Times Living features products that include yoga, spirituality, diet and nutrition and modern forms of physical fitness. The record label has also released DVDs and albums by spiritual groups like Art of Living foundation, Brahma Kumaris and Isha Foundation.

Genre-based mobile apps 
Times Music was the first record label to launch music apps for mobiles that were specific for particular genres. The label has apps that support Android and iOS devices. Times Music has a collection of music apps varying from devotional, classical to Bollywood. Recently, Sunny Leone and Mickey Mehta came out with a fitness app and the DVD Super Hot Sunny Mornings for women of all age groups.

Awards and achievements 
 
Best New Age Album Trophy at 57th Grammy Awards to Ricky Kej for Winds of Samsara
Best background score trophy at the Mirchi Music Awards 2015 to Vishal Bhardwaj for Haider
Best background score trophy to Vishal Bharadwaj at GIMA 2015 for Haider
Best rock album trophy at GIMA 2015 to Mihir Joshi Band for Mumbai Blues
National Award 2015 for best music director to Vishal Bhardwaj for Haider
National Award 2015 for best singer to Sukhwinder Singh for Haider
Times Music albums won three slots on iTunes' "Best of 2014" list:
Best Album: Haider
Best IndiPop Album: Indian Ocean's Tandanu
Devotional Spiritual Superlikes
Ananthaal selected as Apple's "Best Indian Pop Album" of 2015
Ananthaal won the Best Video award for the song "Inayat" at the Radio City Freedom Awards 2016 
Indian Ocean won the Jury's Choice award for Best Fusion Artiste at the 2016 Radio City Freedom Awards

References

External links 

Indian record labels
Hindi cinema
World music record labels
Folk record labels
1998 establishments in Maharashtra
Record labels established in 1998